St. Mary's Islands, also known as Coconut Island and Thonsepar, are a set of four small islands in the Arabian Sea off the coast of Malpe in Udipi, Karnataka, India. They are known for their distinctive geological formation of columnar rhyolitic lava (pictured).

Scientific studies indicate that the basalt of the St. Mary's Islands was formed by sub-aerial subvolcanic activity, because at that time Madagascar was attached to India. The rifting of Madagascar took place around 88 million years ago.

Columnar rhyolite Lava here form one of the four geological monuments in Karnataka state, one of the 34 National Geological Monuments of India declared by the Geological Survey of India in 2016 for their protection, maintenance, promotion and enhancement of geotourism. The monument is considered an important site for "Geo Tourism".

History
In the year 1498, Vasco da Gama landed at St Mary's Islands on his journey from the Kingdom of Portugal, he fixed a cross and named one of these islands O Padrão de Santa Maria in Portuguese, as a dedication to St Mary, the virgin-mother of Jesus Christ, before proceeding to Calicut (Kozhikode) in the 
Malabar region, the present-day Kerala state.

Geography and topography
Out of the four islands, the northernmost island has a basaltic rock formation in a hexagonal form, the only one of its type in India such as Malpe and others. It has prominent coconut trees, its cover reflecting an azure south sea colour, and hence the island is also called Coconut Island. There is no habitation on the islands.

The north–south aligned islands form a non-continuous chain. The four largest islands are Coconut Island, North Island, Daryabahadurgarh Island and South Island.

The islands are generally aligned parallel to the coast line, which provide clues to the phenomenon of uplift of the west coast of India. The islands' terraces and elevated beach deposits along with the tide gauge data at the dead oyster beach in Suratkal (further south of the islands) have been deduced as proof of the reported fall in sea level of about  1 mm/per year.

Geology

The columnar basaltic lava found in these Islands, which is very well developed in the basalts of Deccan Traps, exhibit an imposing range of hexagonal shaped or multi-faced (polygonal) columns split into a horizontal mosaic. In geological terms these are called "columnar joints". Considering the importance and rarity of such an occurrence, these islands were classified as a National Geological Monument in 2001 by the Geological Survey of India.

The Deccan Traps that formed during Cretaceous–Eocene time about  emerged from the vast deluge of hot molten basaltic lava in the western part of India which is now seen as flat topped hills and step like terraces.
Scientific studies carried out at the Indian Institute of Technology, Bombay on the petrology, palaeomagnetism and volcanics of the rocks of the island has brought out the following facts.
 Islands comprise fully of igneous rocks. They have acid composition that consist of dacites, rhyodacites, rhyolites and granophyres and carry basic patches.
 The columnar jointing pattern is well developed on Coconut Island.
 Mineralogically, plagioclase, K-feldspar, quartz, ortho- and clinopyroxenes, olivine, magnetite, and ilmenite are recorded in the ground mass phases
 Magnetic granulometric studies (susceptibility and hysteresis at different temperatures) of island rock samples indicate the presence of a multi domain (MD) state of magnetite. It is inferred that: "the formation of MD could have affected the stability and consistency of magnetic directions in these rocks" and that "this igneous body has been either annealed or could be an intrusive."
An analysis of palaeomagnetic data from India and Madagascar hypothesizes a new India–Madagascar fit related to the Late Cretaceous, directly prior to and during the early phase of Madagascar–India separation. A scientific study paper on Late Cretaceous India–Madagascar fit and timing of break–up related magmatism by several scholars reported in the Wiley Inter Science Journal states: "St. Mary magmatism is linked to the initial break–up between India and Madagascar, and magmatism probably resulted from rift related extensional processes initially induced by the Marion hotspot underlying southern Madagascar during the Late Cretaceous."

Geological age
There are different theories on the age of the St. Mary's Islands rocks. In the analysis reported in the above section it has been further concluded that the multi domain (MD) state found in these rocks are uncommon in the Deccan Traps and non-existent in the Rajmahal Traps. Six selected samples from the islands were subject to whole rock K-Ar dating. This yielded a mean age of 93.1±2.4 (2σ) vis-à-vis the age of the Rajmahal Traps of about 105-100 Ma and about 66-35 Ma of the Deccan Traps. With this appreciation, the author has concluded that the igneous activity of St. Mary's Islands may represent Cretaceous-Tertiary igneous activity.

In a further analysis of the age of the break-up of Greater India (India plus Seychelles) and Madagascar it has been inferred to have occurred in the Upper Cretaceous at 88 Ma. The strength of this inference is based on the approach that the Felsic volcanics (rhyolites and Rhyodacites) of the St. Mary's Islands (SMI), Southern India, were originally interpreted as a distant outlier of the 66 Ma Deccan volcanic province of west–central India, comprising dominantly flood basalts. Later studies had dated it at 93 Ma by the K-Ar dating technique. Since the technique used was a simple use of an average of five out of six widely varying dates and arbitrary data selectivity chosen, the results were not considered reliable. A method of 40Ar–39Ar (argon–argon dating) of the SMI volcanic yields is reportedly more reliable of the plateau and isochron ages.  The weighted mean isochron age is reported to be 85.6±0.9 Ma (2σ). The K–Ar (potassium-argon dating) technique adopted for the southern Indian Precambrian terrain, intruded by numerous mafic–doleritic dyke swarms, the age from Proterozoic to the latest Cretaceous is reported as 69–66 Ma (Deccan-related). The two regional dykes (a leucograbbro and a felsite) from the Kerala region of southwestern India, which were also dated earlier, indicate the age as 85 Ma.  Madagascar flood basalt province's 40Ar–39Ar ages of 89–85 Ma tallies with the SMI volcanic age. The conclusion drawn by the study is that the Madagascar flood basalt province, the SMI volcanics, and possibly the Kerala dykes may well represent volcanic activity associated with the break-up of Greater India and Madagascar, in the Upper Cretaceous at 88 Ma.

Another scientific study on the biogeographic and tectonic history of India reported that: "Although real breaks among the lands were indicated by the physical data, faunal links were maintained by agile animals that were able to surmount minor marine barriers. India, during its northward journey, remained close to Africa and Madagascar even as it began to contact Eurasia."

General information
The western coasts of the islands are a seashell haven with seashells of various shapes and sizes littered along the coast. There is no sand beach to swim and relax since it is scatted with basaltic rocks. The beach has security guards who ensure that visitors do not venture into danger zones of the islands.

All links to the island are only through the mainland town of Malpe, which is a major fishing harbor. The beach at this location is enlivening. It is located 5 km west of Udupi town, the administrative headquarters for the Islands. Apart from the Islands, Malpe too has tourist attractions such as the Vadabhandeshwara Temple and an image of Sri Balarama consecrated by the saint Madhwacharya, the founder of Dvaita Philosophy.

A detailed description of the natural flora and fauna of the islands and the Deria Bahdur Ghur (the islands north of the port of Malpe, named after the cross set up by Vasco da Gama), have been compiled in a manual by John Sturrocks, the district collector of Mangalore in 1894.

Flora and fauna
Colonies of gulls, Scolopacidae (sandpipers) and a few crows have been sighted on the Islands. But on the approach to the Islands from the Malpe beach, brahminy kites (Haliastur indus), great white egrets, grey egrets (breeding plumage) and groups of large Asian green bee-eaters have been recorded.

Visitor Information
The Islands are bereft of buildings, fences, shops. There are no domestic animals either. There are only covered pavilions with park benches on the shore and further inland. Visitors can wander around freely and enjoy the hexagonal formations from vantage locations. Visitors have to carry drinking water and sun screens since the climate is usually hot. Since the last few yards of the approach to the island involves wading, it may be preferable to avoid wearing sneakers.

Access to the islands

The only way of getting to the islands is by boat. For advanced boating service visit malpe beach which is 5.8 km from town Udupi. However the frequency of the boats will be every 20 min. Or regular ferry service ply the 6 km distance from the Malpe fishing harbour (which has a ship building yard also) to the islands. However, the frequency of these boats may vary depending on the number of tourists visiting. The famous religious town  Udupi, is about  West North West of Mangalore. Mumbai, Kochi, Kazhakoottam, Kanjiramattom, Thrippunithura, and Muthalamada are linked to Malpe, by the West Coast Railway. The Konkan Railway (map pictured) passes close to the Islands, starting from Mangalore passing through Udupi, Kundapura, Goa, Ratnagiri and Roha near Mumbai.

Pictures of St. Mary's Islands

See also

 List of places with columnar jointed volcanics
 Azores in the Atlantic Ocean
 Devils Postpile National Monument or The Cove Palisades State Park in the United States
 Fingal's Cave in Scotland
 Giant's Causeway in Northern Ireland
 Adam's Bridge in India-Sri Lanka border

References

External links

Udupi: St Mary's Islands – Nature at its Resplendent Best

Islands of Karnataka
Beaches of Karnataka
Geology of India
Columnar basalts
Geography of Udupi district
National Geological Monuments in India
Islands of India
Uninhabited islands of India